The 7th BRDC International Trophy was a motor race, run to Formula One rules, held on 7 May 1955 at Silverstone Circuit, Northamptonshire. The race was run over 60 laps, and was won by British driver Peter Collins in a Maserati 250F. Collins also shared fastest lap with Maserati driver Roy Salvadori, who was on pole position for the start of the race.

Results

References 

BRDC International Trophy
BRDC International Trophy
BRDC